Varignano Roman Villa is an ancient Roman residence in Varignano, now a frazione of the town of Porto Venere in the province of La Spezia in Italy. Its site is marked by an archaeological museum.

History
Its first construction phase dates to the 1st century BCE and it mainly consisted of a house surrounded by a farm linked to olive oil production. The site is beside the Seno del Varignano Vecchio, overlooking the sea, near the santuario delle Grazie and, to the north-east, the Fortezza del Varignano.

Its main area - the pars urbana - and the productive area - the pars fructuaria - were separated by a courtyard used for 'torcularium' or pressing olives for their oil. The owner's residence was single-storey with atria paved with mosaics, living rooms and bedrooms. Its olive oil processing area contained two presses and a 'cella oleario' were active until the 1st century AD. At that period olive oil production shut down and the vilicus underwent a major rebuild, with the construction of a set of heated rooms and private frigidaria, whose cistern is considered as almost unique among similar buildings in northern Italy. This residence was then active until the 6th century.

References

Archaeological museums in Italy
Roman villas in Italy
Roman sites of Liguria
National museums of Italy